Victor G. Guillory is a retired United States Navy rear admiral who, in his last position, served as the Commander, United States Fourth Fleet.

Early life and career
Guillory was born in New Orleans, Louisiana. He graduated from Holy Cross School in 1973 and went on to graduate from the United States Naval Academy in 1978 with a Bachelor of Science in Management and Technology. His early sea assignments were aboard the guided-missile destroyer , the guided-missile frigate , the cruiser  and as the commissioning executive officer in the cruiser . He commanded the guided-missile frigate  and the cruiser .

Ashore, Guillory's assignments included a brief recruiting tour in his hometown of New Orleans and several Washington-area assignments including the Office of the Chief of Naval Operations as the Surface Warfare Division branch head for Combat Systems, and as the assistant deputy director for Surface Ships. He also served in the Joint Staff as the J-3, Current Readiness branch chief.

Flag officer
Guillory was selected for flag officer rank in early 2004 and assumed command of Amphibious Force, United States Seventh Fleet and Amphibious Group 1/Expeditionary Strike Group 7 in October 2004. During this tour, he was responsible for Joint and Combined amphibious operations throughout the Western Pacific. In addition, he served as the deputy commander of United States Naval Forces for Combined Support Force 535 (Southeast Asia Tsunami Relief Operations) in early 2005.

In December 2006, Guillory returned to Washington D.C. and the Office of the Chief of Naval Operations as the deputy director of Surface Warfare (OPNAV N86B). He assumed the duties as director of Surface Warfare in October 2007 and the responsibility for the warfighting requirements and resources for all surface combatant ships and combat systems. In June 2009, Guillory was selected to assume command of United States Naval Forces Southern Command/United States Fourth Fleet.

Guillory is a graduate of the National Defense University (Industrial College of the Armed Forces) and he is also the 2009 recipient of the Black Engineer of the Year Award for Leadership.

Combat service
While assigned to USS Vincennes, Guillory served in the capacity as the Operations department officer with duties as tactical action officer (TAO) during general quarters. Guillory was seated next to Captain Will C. Rogers III in Combat Information Center and played a significant role in the gun battle with surface combatant vessels of the Iranian Revolutionary Guard (IRG) and the subsequent actions against Iran Air Flight 655 on July 3, 1988.

Awards
Guillory's awards include:

References
This article contains information from the United States Navy and is in the public domain.
Official United States Navy Biography

External links

Commander, U.S. Naval Forces Southern Command | Commander, U.S. Fourth Fleet

Living people
Recipients of the Legion of Merit
African-American United States Navy personnel
United States Naval Academy alumni
United States Navy rear admirals (upper half)
People from New Orleans
Year of birth missing (living people)
21st-century African-American people